The 11th Airborne Division Artillery is an inactive field artillery unit of the United States Army. The unit served with the 11th Airborne Division in the Pacific Theater during World War II, in Germany and the United States during the early Cold War before inactivating in 1958. Reactivated from 1963-65, the unit tested the air mobility concepts at Fort Benning, Georgia, before inactivating again.

History

Lineage & honors

Lineage
Constituted 27 November 1942 in the Army of the United States as Headquarters and Headquarters Battery, 11th Airborne Division Artillery
Activated 25 February 1943 at Camp Mackall, North Carolina
Allotted 15 November 1948 to the Regular Army
Inactivated 1 July 1958 in Germany
Redesignated 17 July 1963 as Headquarters and Headquarters Battery, 11th Air Assault Division Artillery.
Activated 18 July 1963 at Fort Benning, Georgia
Inactivated 1 July 1965 at Fort Benning, Georgia
Redesignated 24 January 1972 as Headquarters and Headquarters Battery, 11th Airborne Division Artillery

Campaign participation credit
World War II: New Guinea; Leyte; Luzon (with arrowhead)

Decorations
Philippine Presidential Unit Citation, Stream embroidered 17 OCTOBER 1944 TO 4 JULY 1945 (11th Airborne Division cited; DA GO 47, 1950)

References

External links
11th Airborne Community (Facebook Page)
Pacific Paratrooper Blog

011
Military units and formations established in 1943
Military units and formations disestablished in 1965